The Critics' Choice Movie Award for Best Actress in a Comedy is one of the awards given to people working in the motion picture industry by the Broadcast Film Critics Association at their annual Critics' Choice Movie Awards.

Winners and nominees

2010s

Multiple nominees

2 nominations
 Jennifer Lawrence

3 nominations
 Melissa McCarthy

A
Film awards for lead actress